is an athletic stadium in Fukuoka, Fukuoka, Japan.

External links
Official site

Sports venues in Fukuoka Prefecture
Football venues in Japan
Athletics (track and field) venues in Japan
Buildings and structures in Fukuoka
Avispa Fukuoka